The 1974–75 Romanian Hockey League season was the 45th season of the Romanian Hockey League. Eight teams participated in the league, and Steaua Bucuresti won the championship.

Final round

5th-8th place

External links
hochei.net

Rom
Romanian Hockey League seasons
Rom